Copelatus mvoungensis is a species of diving beetle. It is part of the genus Copelatus, which is in the subfamily Copelatinae of the family Dytiscidae. It was described by Bilardo & Rocchi in 2004.

References

mvoungensis
Beetles described in 2004